was a Japanese video game developer and publisher.

History
Interchannel was founded on October 2, 1995 as an NEC subsidiary named . Its founding was a result of divisions within NEC being spun off. NEC Interchannel took over NEC Avenue's music and game operations in October 1997, then acquired its music subsidiary, NEC Avenue Music Publishing, in March 1998. 70 percent of the company was sold to Index Corporation for approximately 3 billion yen ($28 million) in 2004. Around this time, NEC Avenue Music Publishing became . Interchannel's games tended to be Japanese only, however the company established Gamebridge Ltd., a UK-based joint venture with Bergsala, that published its games in Europe. Only ten games were ever published.

In 2006, Index Corporation opened their own music label, Index Music, from assets acquired from IC Avenue, where they specialize in publishing music from kids' anime series. In 2008, T.Y. Limited took over their music label, and in 2013, the music label was transferred over to Dreamusic under a new label, Feel Mee.

In November 2007, GungHo Online Entertainment acquired the video game assets of Interchannel from Index Corporation, however, the Interchannel logo and copyright was maintained by Index Corporation. On March 1, 2010, Lightweight acquired Interchannel.

References

External links
Official website (Interchannel)
Official website (NEC Interchannel)
MobyGames
IGN

Amusement companies of Japan
IXIT Corporation
Software companies based in Tokyo
Video game companies established in 1995
Video game companies disestablished in 2010
Defunct video game companies of Japan
Japanese companies established in 1995
Japanese companies disestablished in 2010
Former NEC subsidiaries